Sebastian Poon Wan-fung (born 30 May 1978), also known as his stage name "Tong Hing", is the guitarist and songwriter of the Hong Kong-based band Sugar Club.

Biography
Sebastian Poon worked as a computer cartographer and guitar teacher before signing WOW Music. In 2007, Sebastian decided to form the band Sugar Club with Kandy Wong, who was introduced by his friend. Later, Sugar Club gained the opportunity to perform at Langham Place The Mall every week, until December, 2010.

In 2008, Sugar Club's performance was admired by WOW Music and they were signed to the record label at the same year. On 30 December 2010, they released their debut album I Love Sugar Club Best.

In 2011, Sebastian proposed to his girlfriend Jessie on the first big concert of Sugar Club, and held their wedding ceremony in April, 2013.

In addition to the songs for Sugar Club, Sebastian also writes songs for other singers including Jason Chan, Dicky Cheung, etc.

Filmography

Television dramas

Films

References

External links
 Sebastian's Instagram
 Sebastian's Sina Weibo

1978 births
Living people
Hong Kong songwriters
Hong Kong guitarists
21st-century guitarists